NVC community SD19 (Phleum arenarium - Arenaria serpyllifolia dune annual community) is one of the 16 sand-dune communities in the British National Vegetation Classification system. It is one of six communities associated with foredunes and mobile dunes.

It is a widespread coastal community. There are no subcommunities.

Community composition

The community has five constant species:
 Marram (Ammophila arenaria)
 Thyme-leaved Sandwort (Arenaria serpyllifolia)
 Sand Sedge (Carex arenaria)
 Red Fescue (Festuca rubra)
 Sand Cat's-tail (Phleum arenarium)

Two rare species, Early Sand-grass (Mibora minima) and Dune Fescue (Vulpia membranacea), are associated with this community.

Distribution

This community is widespread but scarce on British coastlines; it is more common in England and Wales than in Scotland, where it has to date only been found at a single site in the southwest.

References

 Rodwell, J. S. (2000) British Plant Communities Volume 5 - Maritime communities and vegetation of open habitats  (hardback),  (paperback)

SD19